Njananikshepam (Malayalam:ജ്ഞാനനിക്ഷേപം) is the first printed magazine in the Malayalam language. The magazine is now published by the Madhya Kerala Diocese of Church of South India.

History
Njananikshepam is one among the early print media published in Kerala state. The magazine started publishing from 1848. Initially the magazine has eight-pages and was printed at the C.M.S. Press, Kottayam. Arch Deacon Koshy and the Reverend George Mathen were behind the publication.

Content

The magazine publishes various articles related to Christian theology, History of Church of South India and news about Madhya Kerala Diocese. Every edition of magazine consists of a letter from the current bishop of Madhya Kerala Diocese which describes the various activities about the diocese. News articles from church organizations i.e., Women's Fellowship, Lay Fellowship, Youth Movement, Bethel Ashram, Choristers Association, Educational Board, are published in the magazine every month. A news column named "Loka Jalakam" which details about the major news events happened across the world is also published every month.

References

See also
Media in Kerala

Monthly magazines published in India
Magazines established in 1848
Malayalam-language magazines
Religious magazines
Mass media in Kerala